Line Mai Nørgaard Hougaard (born 6 October 1999) is a Danish handball player for Herning-Ikast Håndbold and the Danish junior national team.

References

1999 births
Living people
Danish female handball players
21st-century Danish women